Continental Hotels is the first Romanian hotel chain. The chain includes 12 hotels (two-, three-, four- and five-, star hotels). Continental Hotels on the Romanian hospitality market started in 1991. From the very start, the target was the business tourism market. The company’s development aimed at covering the luxury, the business and the economy market, by providing 5, 4, 3 and 2 star accommodation services. Continental Hotels provides accommodation services, in 8 Romanian cities: Bucharest, Arad, Constanța, Oradea, Sibiu, Târgu Mureș, Suceava, Drobeta-Turnu Severin and has 1860 hotel rooms in 12 hotels. The Continental Hotels portfolio comprises the following hotel’s brands: Grand Hotel Continental*****, Continental Forum****, Continental***, MyContinental ***, Hello Hotels**; and also some food & beverage brands: Concerto Restaurant, Balkan Bistro, Bistro Continental, MyBistro, Mondo Restaurant, Victoria Club, Cofetăria Continental, Tekaffe.

Hotels 

Continental Hotels owns properties in major cities in Romania, such as: 
 Grand Hotel Continental Bucharest (5 stars, inaugurated in 2009) 
 Continental Forum (4 stars) in Bucharest, Arad, Constanta, Oradea, Sibiu and Targu Mures
 Continental (3 stars) Suceava, Drobeta-Turnu Severin
 MyContinental (3 stars) Sibiu, Bucharest
 Hello Hotels (2 stars)

Hospitality companies of Romania
Companies based in Bucharest
Hotels established in 1991
Hotel chains
Privately held companies of Romania
Hotels in Romania
Romanian brands